The British film industry produced over six hundred feature films in 2014. This article fully lists all non-pornographic films, including short films, that had a release date in that year and which were at least partly made by the United Kingdom. It does not include films first released in previous years that had release dates in 2014.

Also included is an overview of the major events in British film, including film festivals and awards ceremonies, as well as lists of those films that have been particularly well received, both critically and financially. The year was particularly notable for a number of large-scale co-productions with the United States, such as Guardians of the Galaxy, Interstellar, Maleficent and X-Men: Days of Future Past.

Major releases

January–March

April–June

July–September

October–December

Minor releases

Co-productions

Of the 130 major British releases of 2014, 79 were co-productions with at least one other country. As with other years, the largest number of co-productions were made with the United States, with 40 films, which include all ten of the top ten highest grossing British films of the year. They are listed in full below.

Highest-grossing films
Listed here are the highest grossing British films of 2014, with their total earnings listed in British pound sterling. It includes films released in previous years that made money in 2014, particularly those that had minor releases in 2013 but their main releases in 2014.

Critical reception

Listed here are the top ten best and worst British films of those released in 2014, and listed above as major releases, as per the review aggregators Rotten Tomatoes and Metacritic. The critical scores for Rotten Tomatoes are out of a maximum score of 100, as is the critical score for Metacritic.

Rotten Tomatoes

Metacritic

British award winners

[[File:Judi Dench at the BAFTAs 2007.jpg|thumb|right|150px|Dame Judi Dench received multiple awards nominations for her portrayal of Philomena Lee in Philomena.]]

Academy Awards
The 86th Academy Awards honoring the best films of 2013 were held on 2 March 2014.

British winners:

 12 Years a Slave (Best Picture, Best Adapted Screenplay)
 Gravity (Best Director, Best Original Score, Best Sound Editing, Best Sound Mixing, Best Cinematography, Best Film Editing)
 The Lady in Number 6 (Best Documentary – Short Subject)
 Angela Lansbury (Academy Honorary Award)
 Chris Munro (Best Sound Mixing) - Gravity Glenn Freemantle (Best Sound Editing) - Gravity Malcolm Clarke (Best Documentary – Short Subject) - The Lady in Number 6 Mark Sanger (Best Film Editing) - Gravity Neil Corbould (Best Visual Effects) - Gravity Nicholas Reed (Best Documentary – Short Subject) - The Lady in Number 6 Steve McQueen (Best Picture) - 12 Years a Slave Steven Price (Best Original Score) - Gravity Tim Webber (Best Visual Effects) - GravityBritish nominations:

 12 Years a Slave (Best Director, Best Actor, Best Supporting Actor, Best Supporting Actress, Best Production Design, Best Costume Design, Best Film Editing)
 Gravity (Best Picture, Best Production Design)
 Inside Llewyn Davis (Best Sound Mixing, Best Cinematography)
 Karama Has No Walls (Best Documentary – Short Subject)
 Mandela: Long Walk to Freedom (Best Original Song)
 Philomena (Best Picture, Best Actress, Best Adapted Screenplay, Best Original Score)
 Room on the Broom (Best Animated Short Film)
 Saving Mr. Banks (Best Original Score)
 The Act of Killing (Best Documentary – Feature)
 The Invisible Woman (Best Costume Design)
 The Square (Best Documentary – Feature)
 The Voorman Problem (Best Live Action Short Film)
 Adam Clayton (Best Original Song) - Mandela: Long Walk to Freedom Baldwin Li (Best Live Action Short Film) - The Voorman Problem Chiwetel Ejiofor (Best Actor) - 12 Years a Slave Chris Munro (Best Sound Mixing) - Captain Phillips Christian Bale (Best Actor) - American Hustle David Evans (Best Original Song) - Mandela: Long Walk to Freedom David Heyman (Best Picture) - Gravity Gabrielle Tana (Best Picture) - Philomena Jeff Pope (Best Adapted Screenplay) - Philomena Joanne Woollard (Best Production Design) - Gravity Joe Walker - 12 Years a Slave Judi Dench (Best Actress) - Philomena Mark Gill (Best Live Action Short Film) - The Voorman Problem Mark Taylor (Best Sound Mixing) - Captain Phillips Michael O'Connor (Best Costume Design) - The Invisible Woman Oliver Tarney (Best Sound Editing) - Captain Phillips Roger Deakins (Best Cinematography) - Prisoners Sally Hawkins (Best Supporting Actress) - Blue Jasmine Sara Ishaq (Best Documentary – Short Subject) - Karama Has No Walls Steve Coogan (Best Picture, Best Adapted Screenplay) - Philomena Steve McQueen (Best Director) - 12 Years a Slave Tracey Seaward (Best Picture) - PhilomenaBritish Academy Film Awards
The 67th British Academy Film Awards took place on 16 February 2014.

British winners:

 12 Years a Slave (Best Film, Best Actor in a Leading Role)
 Gravity (Best Director, Best Cinematography, Outstanding British Film, Best Original Music, Best Sound, Best Special Visual Effects)
 Kelly + Victor (Outstanding Debut by a British Writer, Director or Producer)
 Philomena (Best Adapted Screenplay)
 Rush (Best Editing)
 The Act of Killing (Best Documentary)
 Chiwetel Ejiofor (Best Actor in a Leading Role) - 12 Years a Slave Helen Mirren (Academy Fellowship)
 Jeff Pope (Best Adapted Screenplay) - Philomena Kieran Evans (Outstanding Debut by a British Writer, Director or Producer) - Kelly + Victor Peter Greenaway (Outstanding British Contribution to Cinema)
 Steve Coogan (Best Adapted Screenplay) - Philomena Steven Price (Best Original Music) - Gravity Will Poulter (EE Rising Star Award)

British nominations:

 12 Years a Slave (Best Director, Best Actor in a Supporting Role, Best Actress in a Supporting Role, Best Adapted Screenplay, Best Cinematography, Best Original Music, Best Production Design, Best Editing)
 For Those in Peril (Outstanding Debut by a British Writer, Director or Producer)
 Good Vibrations (Outstanding Debut by a British Writer, Director or Producer)
 Gravity (Best Film, Best Actress in a Leading Role, Best Original Screenplay, Best Production Design, Best Editing)
 Inside Llewyn Davis (Best Original Screenplay, Best Cinematography, Best Sound)
 Mandela: Long Walk to Freedom (Outstanding British Film)
 Metro Manila (Best Film Not in the English Language)
 Shell (Outstanding Debut by a British Writer, Director or Producer)
 Philomena (Best Film, Best Actress in a Leading Role, Outstanding British Film)
 Rush (Best Actor in a Supporting Role, Outstanding British Film, Best Sound)
 Saving Mr. Banks (Best Actress in a Leading Role, Outstanding Debut by a British Writer, Director or Producer, Outstanding British Film, Best Original Music, Best Costume Design)
 The Act of Killing (Best Film Not in the English Language)
 The Invisible Woman (Best Costume Design)
 The Selfish Giant (Outstanding British Film)
 Barry Ackroyd (Best Cinematography) - Captain Phillips Christian Bale (Best Actor in a Leading Role) - American Hustle Colin Carberry (Outstanding Debut by a British Writer, Director or Producer) - Good Vibrations Emma Thompson (Best Actress in a Leading Role) - Saving Mr. Banks George MacKay (EE Rising Star Award)
 Henry Jackman (Best Original Music) - Captain Phillips Judi Dench (Best Actress in a Leading Role) - Philomena Kelly Marcel (Outstanding Debut by a British Writer, Director or Producer) - Saving Mr. Banks Paul Greengrass (Best Director) - Captain Phillips Paul Wright (Outstanding Debut by a British Writer, Director or Producer) - For Those in Peril Polly Stokes (Outstanding Debut by a British Writer, Director or Producer) - For Those in Peril Sally Hawkins (Best Actress in a Supporting Role) - Blue Jasmine Scott Graham (Outstanding Debut by a British Writer, Director or Producer) - Shell Sean Bobbitt (Best Cinematography) - 12 Years a Slave Steve McQueen (Best Director) - 12 Years a SlaveCritics' Choice Awards
The 19th Critics' Choice Awards took place on 16 January 2014.

British winners:

 12 Years a Slave (Best Picture, Best Supporting Actress, Best Adapted Screenplay)
 Gravity (Best Director, Best Actress in an Action Movie, Best Sci-Fi/Horror Movie, Best Cinematography, Best Editing, Best Score, Best Visual Effects)
 Mark Sanger (Best Editing) - Gravity Steven Price (Best Score) - GravityBritish nominations:

 12 Years a Slave (Best Director, Best Actor, Best Supporting Actor, Best Acting Ensemble, Best Art Direction, Best Cinematography, Best Editing, Best Makeup, Best Score)
 Gravity (Best Picture, Best Actress, Best Art Direction)
 Inside Llewyn Davis (Best Picture, Best Original Screenplay, Best Cinematography, Best Song)
 Philomena (Best Actress)
 Rush (Best Supporting Actor, Best Action Movie, Best Editing, Best Makeup)
 Saving Mr. Banks (Best Picture, Best Actress, Best Score)
 The Act of Killing (Best Documentary Feature)
 The World's End (Best Comedy, Best Actor in a Comedy)
 Adam Clayton (Best Original Song) - Mandela: Long Walk to Freedom Andy Nicholson (Best Art Direction) - Gravity Asa Butterfield (Best Young Actor/Actress) - Ender's Game Chiwetel Ejiofor (Best Actor) - 12 Years a Slave Chris Martin (Best Song) - The Hunger Games: Catching Fire Christian Bale (Best Actor, Best Actor in a Comedy) - American Hustle David Evans (Best Original Song) - Mandela: Long Walk to Freedom Emma Thompson (Best Actress) - Saving Mr. Banks Guy Berryman (Best Song) - The Hunger Games: Catching Fire Jeff Pope (Best Adapted Screenplay) - Philomena Joe Walker (Best Editing) - 12 Years a Slave Jonny Buckland (Best Song) - The Hunger Games: Catching Fire Judi Dench (Best Actress) - Philomena Paul Greengrass (Best Director) - Captain Phillips Roger Deakins (Best Cinematography) - Prisoners Sean Bobbitt (Best Cinematography) - 12 Years a Slave Simon Pegg (Best Actor in a Comedy) - The World's End Steve Coogan (Best Adapted Screenplay) - Philomena Steve McQueen (Best Director) - 12 Years a Slave Will Champion (Best Song) - The Hunger Games: Catching FireGolden Globe Awards
The 71st Golden Globe Awards were held on 12 January 2014.

British winners:

 12 Years a Slave (Best Motion Picture – Drama)
 Gravity (Best Director)
 Adam Clayton (Best Original Song) - Mandela: Long Walk to Freedom David Evans (Best Original Song) - Mandela: Long Walk to FreedomBritish nominations:

 12 Years a Slave (Best Actor – Motion Picture Drama, Best Supporting Actor, Best Supporting Actress, Best Screenplay, Best Original Score)
 Gravity (Best Motion Picture – Drama, Best Actress – Motion Picture Drama, Best Original Score)
 Inside Llewyn Davis (Best Motion Picture – Musical or Comedy, Best Actor – Motion Picture Musical or Comedy, Best Original Song)
 Mandela: Long Walk to Freedom (Best Actor – Motion Picture Drama, Best Original Score)
 One Chance (Best Original Song)
 Philomena (Best Motion Picture – Drama, Best Actress – Motion Picture Drama)
 Rush (Best Motion Picture – Drama, Best Supporting Actor)
 Saving Mr. Banks (Best Actress – Motion Picture Drama)
 Adam Clayton (Best Original Song) - Mandela: Long Walk to Freedom Alex Heffes (Best Original Score) - Mandela: Long Walk to Freedom Chiwetel Ejiofor (Best Actor – Motion Picture Drama) - 12 Years a Slave Chris Martin (Best Original Song) - The Hunger Games: Catching Fire David Evans (Best Original Song) - Mandela: Long Walk to Freedom Emma Thompson (Best Actress – Motion Picture Drama) - Saving Mr. Banks Guy Berryman (Best Original Song) - The Hunger Games: Catching Fire Idris Elba (Best Actor – Motion Picture Drama) - Mandela: Long Walk to Freedom Jeff Pope (Best Screenplay) - Philomena Jonny Buckland (Best Original Song) - The Hunger Games: Catching Fire Judi Dench (Best Actress – Motion Picture Drama) - Philomena Kate Winslet (Best Actress – Motion Picture Drama) - Labor Day Sally Hawkins (Best Supporting Actress) - Blue Jasmine Steve Coogan (Best Screenplay) - Philomena Steven Price (Best Original Score) - Gravity Will Champion (Best Original Song) - The Hunger Games: Catching FireScreen Actors Guild Awards
The 20th Screen Actors Guild Awards were held on 18 January 2014.

British winners:

 12 Years a Slave (Outstanding Performance by a Female Actor in a Supporting Role)
 Christian Bale (Outstanding Performance by a Cast in a Motion Picture) - American Hustle Jack Huston (Outstanding Performance by a Cast in a Motion Picture) - American HustleBritish nominations:

 12 Years a Slave (Outstanding Performance by a Male Actor in a Leading Role, Outstanding Performance by a Male Actor in a Supporting Role, Outstanding Performance by a Cast in a Motion Picture)
 Gravity (Outstanding Performance by a Female Actor in a Leading Role)
 Philomena (Outstanding Performance by a Female Actor in a Leading Role)
 Rush (Outstanding Performance by a Male Actor in a Supporting Role, Outstanding Performance by a Stunt Ensemble in a Motion Picture)
 Saving Mr. Banks (Outstanding Performance by a Female Actor in a Leading Role)
 Alan Rickman (Outstanding Performance by a Cast in a Motion Picture) - The Butler Alex Pettyfer (Outstanding Performance by a Cast in a Motion Picture) - The Butler Benedict Cumberbatch (Outstanding Performance by a Cast in a Motion Picture) - 12 Years a Slave, August: Osage County Chiwetel Ejiofor (Outstanding Performance by a Male Actor in a Leading Role, Outstanding Performance by a Cast in a Motion Picture) - 12 Years a Slave David Oyelowo (Outstanding Performance by a Cast in a Motion Picture) - The Butler Emma Thompson (Outstanding Performance by a Female Actor in a Leading Role) - Saving Mr. Banks Judi Dench (Outstanding Performance by a Female Actor in a Leading Role) - Philomena Vanessa Redgrave (Outstanding Performance by a Cast in a Motion Picture) - The Butler''

Notable deaths

See also

 2014 in film
 2014 in British music
 2014 in British radio
 2014 in British television
 2014 in the United Kingdom
 Cinema of the United Kingdom
 List of 2014 box office number-one films in the United Kingdom
 List of British submissions for the Academy Award for Best Foreign Language Film
 List of British films of 2013
 List of British films of 2015

References

External links
 2014 in film
 List of 2014 box office number-one films in the United Kingdom
 
 List of British films of 2015

Lists of 2014 films by country or language
2014
Films